The Witch of Berkeley is a medieval English legend describing a woman from Berkeley, Gloucestershire, who sold her soul to the Devil for wealth. After being alerted to her encroaching demise by an omen from her pet jackdaw, she leaves instructions with her children on how to safeguard her spirit after death. In accordance with her wishes, her body is wrapped in elk hide and then placed inside a stone coffin which is then fastened by three chains. For three nights her family stood watch over her grave, but each night a demon came a broke one of the chains. On the third night, when all the chains had been broken, the Devil appeared and set the Witch on ‘a black horse… with iron hooks projecting over the whole of his back.' She was then carried off into Hell leaving nothing but the sound of 'her pitiable cries'.

In popular culture
In Mike Mignola's comic book Hellboy, the titular character is born from a dead witch who is dragged from her coffin into Hell by a demon. This episode follows the Berkeley legend almost verbatim, right down to the hook-covered horse, but moves the setting to the fictional village of East Bromwich.

References

English folklore
Legendary English people

Fictional characters who have made pacts with devils

Berkeley, Gloucestershire
Supernatural legends
Witchcraft in England